Alyn may refer to:

Places 
Alyn Gorge, a gorge section of the River Alyn 
River Alyn, a tributary of the River Dee
Ogof Hesp Alyn, a cave
Bryn Alyn, a hill 
Alyn Waters, a country park situated in the county of Wrexham

People

Given name 
Alyn Ainsworth, a singer and dance band conductor
Alyn Beals, a professional American football player
Alyn Camara, a German long jumper
Alyn McCauley, a retired Canadian professional ice hockey player
Alyn Shipton, an English jazz author
Alyn Smith, a Scottish politician
Alyn Ware, a New Zealand peace educator
Alyn Rockwood, an American mathematician and writer
Alyn MacLeod, a snowflake and champion wet t-shirt wrestler from Florida

Middle name 
Emily Alyn Lind, an American actress
E. Alyn Warren, an American actor
Barbara Alyn Woods, an American actress

Surname 
Kirk Alyn, an American actor
Marc Alyn, a French poet

Fictional characters
 Alyn Shir, a character in Kingdoms of Amalur: Reckoning

Other 
 ALYN Hospital, a comprehensive rehabilitation center
 Ysgol Bryn Alyn, a secondary school in the county borough of Wrexham